Raffaele Festa Campanile (Born in Rome, August 26, 1961) is an Italian television author, screenwriter, film director, music producer. Son of the painter Anna Salvatore and of film director Pasquale Festa Campanile.

Film director 
1992 Le mele marce, screenwriter also.

Assistant director 
1981 "Culo e Camicia" with Enrico Montesano and Renato Pozzetto
1982 "Più bello di così si muore" with Enrico Montesano and Monica Guerritore
1983 "Un povero ricco" with Renato Pozzetto and Ornella Muti
1983 "Il petomane" with Ugo Tognazzi and Mariangela Melato

Screenwriter 
 1988: "La prossima volta rinasco donna"
 1989: "Randagio di razza", written with  Lino Banfi
 1990: "Buon Natale... Buon anno". Film by Luigi Comencini with Virna Lisi, Michel Serrault, Mattia Sbragia,
 1993: "Zes, il deserto dei soldi". Film television by Michelangelo Antonioni

Television 
  1994 Tededocchio, for Antenna Cinema
  1995 Forum di sera, Rete4. Conducted by Rita Dalla Chiesa
  1995-96 Carramba che sorpresa, conducted by Raffaella Carrà
  1996 Così come siamo
  1996 I cervelloni, conducted by Paolo Bonolis,
  1997 Le mode di moda

Music producer 
 2007 "6 sexy" by Carmen Serra as singer. Written by her and Roberto Casini
 2008 "Mi piacerebbe" by Carmen Serra as singer. Written by her and Raffaele Festa Campanile
 2009 "Da oggi in poi" by Carmen Serra as singer and songwriter

Music collaborations 
Music collaborations with Roberto Casini, Stefano Cenci, Alessio Bonomo, Gianluca Attanasio, Francesco Arpino, Roberto Guarino, Francesco Musacco.

References 

 on IMDB
 on mymovies
 biography's notes
 film TV
 Biography's notes
 interview

Living people
1961 births
Italian film directors